Ulf-Erik Alexander Slotte (15 November 1931 – 5 November 2019, Helsinki) was a Finnish diplomat.

Slotte was born in Helsinki. He studied history at the University of Helsinki and graduated as Master of Philosophy in 1955. He was a negotiating officer from the Ministry for Foreign Affairs from 1973 to 1977, Ambassador to Ankara in 1977–1983, Administrative Under-Secretary of State since 1983, Ambassador in Canberra from 1988 to 1991 and in Dublin from 1991 until his retirement, until 1996.

References 

Ambassadors of Finland to Australia
Ambassadors of Finland to Ireland
Ambassadors of Finland to Turkey
1931 births
Diplomats from Helsinki
2019 deaths
University of Helsinki alumni